Presque rien (meaning Almost Nothing, which is also the UK release title; the U.S. title is Come Undone) is a 2000 French-Belgian romantic drama film directed by Sebastien Lifshitz, set in Brittany, depicting a stormy holiday romance between two teenagers and what remains of that relationship eighteen months later.

Plot
Upper-middle class Mathieu, is spending his summer vacation on the French coast before beginning studies in the autumn to become an architect. His mother is deeply depressed because of the death of his baby brother from cancer, and is cared for by her sister, while Mathieu and his moody younger sister cannot get along.

Then he meets Cédric at the beach, who is attractive and obviously looking for a boyfriend. The boys embark on a romance, and Mathieu's sudden secrecy and long hours away from home invite the curiosity of both his sister and aunt.

A parallel plotline focuses on Mathieu eighteen months later, as he recovers from the shock of their separation. After Mathieu has tried to commit suicide, he chooses to go back to the small seaside town to learn how to deal with what happened.

The film ends on a hopeful note when Mathieu looks up Pierre, another former boyfriend of Cédric's living in the seaside town, and they overcome past tensions to discover that they understand each other.

Cast
 Jérémie Elkaïm as Mathieu
 Stéphane Rideau as Cédric
 Dominique Reymond as Mother
 Marie Matheron as Annick
 Laetitia Legrix as Sarah
 Nils Ohlund as Pierre

Production
Rather than having a clear, chronologically ordered narrative, the movie switches between the summer and the winter plotlines, depicting the differences in Mathieu's life at both points, as well as establishing the contrast between one and the other visually.

Soundtrack
The soundtrack uses songs by Irish singer and songwriter Perry Blake (from his album Still Life) to convey Mathieu's melancholic, depressive mood.

See also
 List of lesbian, gay, bisexual, or transgender-related films by storyline

References

External links
 
 
 
 
 

2000 films
2000 independent films
2000 LGBT-related films
2000 romantic drama films
2000s coming-of-age drama films
2000s French-language films
Belgian coming-of-age drama films
Belgian independent films
Belgian LGBT-related films
Belgian romantic drama films
Coming-of-age romance films
Films directed by Sébastien Lifshitz
French coming-of-age drama films
French independent films
French LGBT-related films
French romantic drama films
French-language Belgian films
Gay-related films
LGBT-related coming-of-age films
LGBT-related romantic drama films
2000s French films